Pseudochazara turkestana is a species of butterfly in the family Nymphalidae. It is confined to Afghanistan through the mountains of Middle Asia to the south-west Altai.

Flight period 
The species is univoltine and is on wing from June to August.

Food plants
Larvae feed on grasses.

Subspecies
Pseudochazara turkestana turkestana Afghanistan
Pseudochazara turkestana esquilinus (Fruhstorfer, 1911) Alay Mountains
Pseudochazara turkestana sagina (Ruhl, [1894]) Tajikistan, Ghissar, southern Ghissar, Darvaz, the western Pamirs
Pseudochazara turkestana tarbagata (Staudinger, 1901) Dzhungarsky Alatau, Saur and Tarbagatai, Kazakhstan, the south-west Altai

References

 Satyrinae of the Western Palearctic - Pseudochazara turkestana

Pseudochazara
Butterflies described in 1893
Butterflies of Asia